Alain Bouffard (born 24 September 1939) is a French coxswain. He competed at the 1960 Summer Olympics in Rome with the men's eight where they came fourth.

References

External links 
 

1939 births
Living people
French male rowers
Olympic rowers of France
Rowers at the 1960 Summer Olympics
Sportspeople from Nantes
Coxswains (rowing)
World Rowing Championships medalists for France
Rowers at the 1964 Summer Olympics
European Rowing Championships medalists